Mikhaylovka is a rural locality (a settlement) in Shimolinsky Selsoviet, Blagoveshchensky District, Altai Krai, Russia. The population was 157 as of 2013. There are 3 streets.

Geography 
Mikhaylovka is located 35 km northeast of Blagoveshchenka (the district's administrative centre) by road. Shimolino is the nearest rural locality.

References 

Rural localities in Blagoveshchensky District, Altai Krai